Laureate na nÓg is a position awarded in Ireland once every two years to a distinguished writer or illustrator of children's books. It was set up by the Arts Council of Ireland in 2010. It is intended "to engage young people with high quality children's literature and to underline the importance of children's literature in our cultural and imaginative life".

Siobhán Parkinson was the first Laureate. As of 2020, Áine Ní Ghlinn is the incumbent Laureate na nÓg.

History

Siobhán Parkinson, described by The Irish Times as "one of Ireland's foremost children's writers", was announced as the first holder of the post on 10 May 2010. President of Ireland Mary McAleese revealed the news at an event held at the Irish Arts Council in Dublin, and presented Parkinson with the silver Laureate na nÓg medal.

Parkinson announced one of her main aims was that "every child in the country has access to a nice, bright, warm, cheerful, comfortable library, where they can go and find the books that will open their minds and bring them into wonderful imaginary places". One of Parkinson's first requests was an appeal to the Government of Ireland for the restoration of school library system funding which it had removed due to cuts.

List of position holders

See also

 Children's Laureate

References

External links
 

Irish children's literature
Irish children's literary awards